William Henry Burton (1739–1818) was an Irish politician.

Burton was born in County Carlow and educated at Kilkenny College and Trinity College, Dublin. He served as a captain in the 13th Dragoons from 1766 to 1770.

Burton represented  Gowran from 1761 until 1768 and County Carlow from 1768 until 1802.

References

1739 births
People from County Carlow
1818 deaths
Irish MPs 1761–1768
Irish MPs 1769–1776
Irish MPs 1776–1783
Irish MPs 1783–1790
Irish MPs 1790–1797
Irish MPs 1798–1800
Members of the Parliament of Ireland (pre-1801) for County Kilkenny constituencies
Members of the Parliament of Ireland (pre-1801) for County Carlow constituencies
Politicians from County Carlow
UK MPs 1801–1802
Alumni of Trinity College Dublin